Cənubi is a village in Baku, Azerbaijan.

References 

Villages in Azerbaijan
Populated places in Baku